Food Town may refer to:

 Seaway Food Town, a defunct supermarket chain that formerly operated in Ohio and Michigan
 Lewis Food Town, a grocery store chain headquartered in Houston, Texas
 Food City (Canada), a Canadian grocery store chain also called Food Town 
 Food Lion, an American grocery store chain headquartered in Salisbury, NC, and known as Food Town from 1957 to 1983

See also
 Foodtown, a New Zealand supermarket chain
 Foodtown (United States), a supermarket cooperative with stores in New York, New Jersey and Pennsylvania